Ha is the second studio album by English record producer Talvin Singh, released on Island Records in 2001. It peaked at number 57 on the UK Albums Chart.

Track listing

Charts

References

External links
 

2001 albums
Talvin Singh albums
Island Records albums